Weronika Falkowska (born 17 June 2000) is a Polish tennis player. She has career-high WTA rankings of 246 in singles and 112 in doubles, achieved in December 2022.

Falkowska made her WTA Tour main-draw debut at the 2021 Poland Open, having received entry as a lucky loser. She was drawn against Katerina Bondarenko who had beaten her in the final qualifying round, with Falkowska prevailing in less than an hour and losing only two games. She also received a wildcard into the doubles draw, partnering Paula Kania-Choduń.

WTA Challenger finals

Doubles: 2 (2 titles)

ITF Circuit finals

Singles: 10 (5 titles, 5 runner–ups)

Doubles: 31 (15 titles, 16 runner–ups)

References

External links
 
 

2000 births
Living people
Polish female tennis players
21st-century Polish women